Shahidul Amin ( – 6 August 2017) was a Bangladeshi director, playwright, actor and screenplay writer.

Biography
Amin directed Ramer Sumoti was released in 1985. He was the screenplay writer of that film too. This film won National Film Award in two categories. This film was the first film of Sadek Bachchu.

Amin also directed films like Ruper Rani Chorer Raja and Rajkumari Chandraban. These films are selected for preservation in Bangladesh Film Archive. He also involved in acting in films and dramas.

Amin died on 6 August 2017 at the age of 81.

Selected filmography

Director
 Rajkumari Chandraban (1970)
 Rajkumari Chandraban (1979)
 Ruper Rani Chorer Raja (1979)
 Shahzadi Gulbahar (1980)
 Ramer Sumati (1985)
 Mayamrigo
 Bibad

Actor
 Hiramon
 Deyal
 Matir Kole
 Kokhono Asheni
 Shonkhonil Karagar

Screenplay Writer
 Ramer Sumoti

References

External links
 

1930s births
2017 deaths
Bangladeshi film directors
Bangladeshi screenwriters
Bangladeshi male film actors
Bangladeshi dramatists and playwrights